VR-Group Plc, commonly known as VR, is a government-owned railway company in Finland. VR's most important function is the operation of Finland's passenger rail services with 250 long-distance and 800 commuter rail services every day. With 7,500 employees and net sales of €1,251 million in 2017, VR is one of the most significant operators in the Finnish public transport market area.

VR was created in 1995 after being known as Suomen Valtion Rautatiet ('Finnish State Railways') from 1862 to 1922, and Valtionrautatiet ('State Railways') from 1922 to 1995.

As part of the concern, Avecra is a subsidiary for onboard catering service, Pohjolan Liikenne for bus traffic, VR Track for developing and maintaining of infrastructure and VR Transpoint for freight. Since 2017, its headquarters is located at the Iso Paja building, previously occupied by the state-owned broadcasting company Yle, in northern-central Helsinki.

History

Rail transport started in Finland in 1862 between Helsinki and Hämeenlinna, and multiple main lines and smaller private railways were built in the following decades. VR mainly operated on the high-demand main lines. During the twentieth century, most private railway companies were shut down and VR assumed a monopoly in rail transport. In 1995 the company went through a process of corporatization to become the VR Group.

Since 2010, the maintenance and the construction of the railway network have been the responsibility of the Finnish Transport Agency. The operation and network were originally carried out by the parent company Valtionrautatiet until 1995, when it was split into VR and the rail administration entity Ratahallintokeskus.

Organization
Companies in the group provide road freight and bus services, catering and real estate management, and provide data, technological, and telecommunications services for the transport and logistics sectors. The group owns a bus company, Pohjolan Liikenne, and a road freight haulage company VR Transpoint.

Altogether the group of companies includes 21 companies employing a total of about 14,400 people.

Services

Because in most parts of Finland the density of population is low, Finland is not optimally suited for railways. Commuter services are nowadays rare outside the Helsinki area, but express trains interconnect most cities. As in France, the majority of passenger services are connections to the capital, Helsinki. In the 2010s, VR has made connections faster by reducing stops at minor stations and increasing running speeds with new locomotives and renovated high-speed trains.

VR provides car transport services. Seven stations allow loading and unloading of cars on trains: Helsinki, Turku and Tampere in the south, Oulu further north, and Rovaniemi, Kemijärvi and Kolari in Lapland. Car transport trains stop at other stations along the way for normal passenger transport and is available as daily service to Rovaniemi and Kemijärvi and several times a week to Kolari. Finland is the only Nordic country to offer car transport on trains, however, car transport on trains is available on many European countries outside the Nordic countries. In August 2021 VR commenced operating the Tampere light rail.

In March 2022, VR acquired the Swedish bus and rail company Arriva Sverige, which operates urban transport in Stockholm and regional transport in southern and southeastern Sweden. Arriva Sverige was part of Arriva Group and owned by Deutsche Bahn. Following the acquisition, it was announced that Arriva Sverige would become an independent company within the VR Group.

Commuter rail

VR operates the commuter traffic in the Helsinki area on behalf of HSL and its own commuter rail services in southern Finland.

International services

There is an international passenger rail service from Finland to Russia. As of June 2011, there are four Allegro passenger trains per day to Saint Petersburg and one overnight train to Moscow via Saint Petersburg called the Tolstoi (named after Leo Tolstoy). The tracks on the Helsinki – Saint Petersburg line were upgraded to enable a higher running speed up to 220 km/h before the Allegro started its service.

Freight
Domestic and international freight services are provided by VR Transpoint, part of VR. In 2009, both domestic and international freight traffic declined, which worsened VR's financial position. International freight traffic is concentrated to the four railways across the Russian border but there is also a connection to the Swedish rail network in Tornio. Formerly, even rail ferry connections from Turku to Stockholm, Sweden, and to Travemünde, Germany has existed.

Rolling stock

Locomotives 

VR operated steam locomotives until 1975. Although the regular use of steam traction for scheduled passenger services ended in 1970, occasional use continued until 1975. As of 2011, the company operates two classes of electric locomotives (Sr1 and Sr2) and three classes of diesel locomotives (Dv12, Dr14 and Dr16). The use of diesel locomotive hauled passenger trains has declined due to electrification of all main lines and the (re)introduction of railbuses (Dm12) on secondary routes.

In October 2010, VR announced plans to renew its locomotive fleet by ordering around 200 new locomotives, which are expected to enter service in 2015–25.

On 20 December 2013, VR announced plans to purchase 80 new electric locomotives, with 97 options. This upcoming Sr3 will be based on the Siemens Vectron and will replace the aging Sr1's. The locomotives will be fitted with helper diesel engines that can be used for shunting in partly unelectrified railyards. Deliveries will occur between 2017 and 2026.

Locomotive classification system 

At the beginning of traffic, locomotives were distinguished by their names, and by 1865 also by their numbers. In 1887, the locomotives were given their original classification system. It was based on the wheel arrangement of the locomotives: each wheel arrangement was assigned a letter of the alphabet, which was followed by a serial number. The assignment of letters to different wheel arrangements was made when the first locomotive using it was brought into service; the letter A signified a 4-4-0 wheelbase in the Whyte notation, B signified a 0-4-2ST locomotive, C a 0-6-0 locomotive, and so on.

On 8 October 1942, the notation system was changed to two letters and a serial number. The first letter in the designation now signified the types of trains the locomotive was generally planned to haul:
 H for passenger trains,
 P for local (commuter) trains,
 T for freight trains,
 S for mixed freight-passenger trains and
 V (vaihto, literally "switch") for shunters.
The second small letter indicated the weight of the locomotive:
 r (raskas) = heavy (axle load over 14.1 t)
 v (väliraskas) = midweight (axle load 11.1–14.0 t)
 k (kevyt) = light (axle load under 11.0 t)
 m = mechanical transmission (in multiple units)
 s (sähkö 'electric(ity)') = electrical transmission (in multiple units).

When diesel locomotives were taken into service in the 1950s, they were additionally differentiated by the steam locomotive classes by beginning their numbering from 11 instead of the next free number in running order. As a result, the last steam-powered heavy passenger locomotive class was designated Hr3, and its first diesel-powered counterpart Hr11.

The current VR locomotive classification system was taken into use on 1 January 1976. The first (capital) letter was now used to differentiate between locomotive types: S for electric, D for diesel and T for maintenance equipment. The serial numbers of diesel locomotive classes were not changed, the Hr11 class becoming Dr11. In addition to this the borderline between midweight and heavy locomotives was changed to 15.1 tons and the second letter in multiple units is always m (for ).

Carriages

The wide Finnish loading gauge allows the passenger coaches to be considerably wider than most European passenger coaches. The aisle and seats are wider than in other European trains in the standard 2+2 configuration, and in commuter traffic 3+2 seat configuration is used to allow more seats for the same train length. The last wooden-bodied carriages were withdrawn by the mid-1980s. Prior to the 1970s these had been the mainstay of VR's passenger rolling stock.

VR has three types of locomotive hauled passenger coaches:

 Double-deck InterCity carriages are the common coaches in the long-distance trains and the mainstay of VR's network. There are several variants, including coaches with first class service, family-friendly coaches and coaches with bike as baggage capability. The coaches are built in Finland by Transtech Oy and they VR's most modern carriages. More coaches has been ordered to replace the last blue carriages and to increase capacity on the most popular routes. Their top speed is 200 km/h.
 Single-deck InterCity carriages are used to increase capacity whenever no double-deck coaches are not available. Top speed is 200 km/h.
"Blue" carriages, as they are popularly known as such due to their blue and light gray liveries, are used on night express trains from Helsinki to Kolari and Kemijärvi. Top speed is 140 or 160 km/h.

In addition to these, VR has ordered 12+13 Class Edo control cars from Transtech, eight of which have been in regular passenger traffic since 29 October 2013. The cars are used in InterCity connections with the Sr2 and the upcoming Sr3 locomotives pushing the train.

First class, or Extra as VR calls it, is marked with Extra signs outside of the coaches on InterCity trains. Even restaurant coaches are marked similarly.

On the "Blue" carriages, first class used to be distinguished by a yellow stripe above the windows and restaurant cars by a red stripe. Cars equipped with diesel generators, which are used to provide electricity to InterCity or sleeper wagons on non-electrified tracks, can be distinguished by a blue stripe above the windows.

Sleeper cars

VR operates sleeper services between Helsinki/Turku and Lapland, which also include car-carrying (motorail) wagons. Double-deck sleeping carriages (including rooms with en suite showers and toilets) were introduced on the Helsinki–Rovaniemi service in the 2000s. These wagons are painted in a green-and-white livery similar to the InterCity coaches. Since 2016, the new coaches have begun to replace the blue carriages even on the way to Kolari.

Electrification extends from Oulu northwards to Kemijärvi. In 2006, direct sleeper services were discontinued beyond Rovaniemi (to Kemijärvi) because the new double-deck sleeping carriages were unable to operate with diesel haulage. The sleeper service to Kemijärvi was restarted in March 2008, by adding to the train in Rovaniemi a new diesel generator car supplying 1 500 V electricity for the sleeper cars between Rovaniemi and Kemijärvi; this setup was continued in use until the electrification extension to Kemijärvi was completed at the end of 2013. Sleeper services between Turku and Joensuu and Helsinki and Kajaani were withdrawn in 2006, but with the new direct line between Lahti and Kerava, the daytime services were made quicker.

On 12 January 2009, VR announced they had requested tenders for the purchase of 20 new sleeping cars, valued at €60–70 million. The two bidders interested were Alstom, which manufactures the Pendolino and some commuter trains for VR, and Finnish Transtech, which manufactured VR's new sleeping cars. The decision led to the resignation of the President and CEO of VR-Group, Henri Kuitunen, and the group's Chairman of the Board, Antti Lagerroos. Helsingin Sanomat reported they had wanted to defer the replacement of older sleeping car rolling stock until 2012 at the earliest. However, the decision went ahead because VR is a state owned business and there was pressure to seek orders from Finnish Transtech, which is currently struggling due to market downturns, in order to secure jobs.

Freight wagons
The Finnish loading gauge allows the operation of freight vehicles considerably larger than most other railways in the European Union. Road trailers (often of VR's subsidiary Transpoint) can be easily accommodated on ordinary flat wagons. Much of the freight on the VR network is carried from Russia in Russian wagons, including large capacity eight-axle oil tank wagons.

VR also has a one-third ownership of SeaRail, a specialist operator of freight wagons designed for through running (via ferry) to Sweden and elsewhere in Western Europe.

Multiple units

The Sm3 class Pendolino is the VR's "flagship", mainly connecting largest cities to the capital with top running speed up to 220 km/h. Other EMUs in use are the Sm2 and Sm4 on Helsinki area commuter services. In addition, VR operates Pääkaupunkiseudun Junakalusto Oy -owned Sm5 class EMUs in Helsinki local traffic and Sm6 Allegro under a joint venture of VR and the Russian railways, Karelian Trains, between Helsinki and Saint Petersburg.

VR currently operates one class of diesel-powered multiple units: the Czech-built single carriage Dm12, which is used mainly on secondary lines.

Multiple unit classification system
The multiple unit classification system follows a similar logic as the locomotive classification system: the first letter signifies the power source (in addition to electric and diesel, gasoline (B, bensiini) and wood gas (P, puukaasu) have been used), followed by the letter m (moottorivaunu) signifyng a multiple unit, followed by a serial number.

Livery

VR has used several liveries in the past. When InterCity traffic started during the 1980s, VR's colour scheme was changed to red and white. In 2009, VR changed its corporate colour to green and all the coaches have been repainted in green and white.

See also 
ExpressBus
Rail transport in Finland
VR Transpoint
 Finnish Railway Museum
 List of Finnish locomotives

References

Literature

External links 

VR
VR Group
Finnish Rail Administration
Finnish Railway History Society
Finnish Railway Museum
Railway page for Finland (maintained by Kimmo Kotimäki)
Transtech Oy (Finnish rolling stock manufacturer, formerly Talgo Oy)
Steam Locomotives in Finland Including the Finnish Railway Museum
  illustrated description of Finland's railways in the 1930s

Railway companies of Finland
Government-owned companies of Finland
1862 establishments in Finland
Companies established in 1862
Rail transport articles in need of updating
Finnish brands